Cyllogenes suradeva, the branded evening brown, is a brown (Satyrinae) butterfly that is found in the Himalayas.

Range
The butterfly is found in the Himalayas in Sikkim and Bhutan.

Status
In 1932 William Harry Evans described it as rare.

Description

The branded evening brown is 75 to 85 mm in wingspan and broadly resembles the Melanitis evening browns, with a strong purple tinge above. The upper forewing has a narrow yellow apical band which does not reach the termen. The male has a large black brand on the upper forewing at the bases of 2 to 5 and the end cell.

Habits
It is a low-elevation butterfly.

See also
Satyrinae
Nymphalidae
List of butterflies of India (Satyrinae)

References

 

Melanitini
Butterflies of Asia